Jane Aitken (1764–1832) was an American printer and publisher known for printing Charles Thomson's translation of the Septuagint into English, as well as Rebecca Rush's novel Kelroy. She was the first printer to issue a Philadelphia census directory containing a section devoted to "persons of colour".

Some of her papers are held in the collections of one of her clients, the American Philosophical Society.

Further reading

See also
 Thomson's Translation

References

External links 
Jane Aitken documentation at the American Philosophical Society

1764 births
1832 deaths
American publishers (people)
American printers
19th-century publishers (people)
Businesspeople from Philadelphia
Scottish emigrants to the Thirteen Colonies
People from Paisley, Renfrewshire
People of colonial Pennsylvania
Women printers
Colonial American merchants
19th-century American businesspeople
19th-century American businesswomen
Colonial American women
American women journalists
History of women in the United States